Keith Grover (born in Provo, Utah) is an American politician and a Republican member of the Utah Senate. Grover has represented Senate district 23 since 2023. Prior to redistricting he represented district 15 starting in June 2018.

Early life and career
Grover was born in Provo, Utah. As a young man, Grover spent two year proselyting for the Church of Jesus Christ of Latter-day Saints (LDS Church) in Paraguay. He later earned his BS from Brigham Young University, and his MEd and EdD from the University of Utah.

Outside of his duties in the legislature, Grover has served as an administrator with the Alpine School District.

Political career
2006 - Grover originally ran for office when District 61 incumbent Republican Representative Margaret Dayton ran for Utah State Senate and left the seat open.  Grover won the 2006 Republican Primary with 1,678 votes (53.5%) and won the three-way November 7, 2006 General election with 4,222 votes (67.1%) against Democratic nominee Susan Chasson (who had run for the seat in 2004) and Constitution candidate Steve Saunders.
2008 - Grover was challenged during the primary election, but was chosen to be the Republican candidate for the November 4, 2008 general election. He won with 7,100 votes (64.5%) against Democratic nominee Deon Turley.
2010 - Grover ran against Democrat Deon Turley for the second time. Grover won the November 2, 2010 general election with 4,374 votes (65.1%) against Turley.
2012 - Grover was unopposed for the June 26, 2012 Republican Primary and won the November 6, 2012 general election with 8,786 votes (78.4%) against Democratic nominee Robert Patterson.
2014 - Grover was unopposed in the June 24, 2014 Republican convention and won the November 4, 2014 general election with 4,414 votes (80.4%) against Democratic nominee Robert Patterson.

During the 2016 legislative session, Grover served on the Higher Education Appropriations Subcommittee, the House Public Utilities, Energy, and Technology Committee, and the House Government Operations Committee.  During the interim, Grover served on the Economic Development and Workforce Services Interim Committee and the Public Utilities, Energy, and Technology Interim Committee. He also serves on the State Water Development Commission, and Utah International Relations and Trade Commission.

2016 sponsored legislation

Grover floor sponsored SB0001 Higher Education Base Budget, SB0023 Water Law - Protected Purchaser Amendments, SB0044 Construction Code Amendments, SB0062 Jrotc Instructor Amendment, SB0221 Capitol Protocol Amendments, and SJR006 Joint Resolution Recognizing the 100th Anniversary of the JROTC Program.

References

External links
Official page at the Utah State Legislature
Campaign site
Keith Grover at Ballotpedia
Keith Grover at the National Institute on Money in State Politics
Campaign Contributions  at Sunlight Foundation
Legislation

Year of birth missing (living people)
Living people
Brigham Young University alumni
Republican Party members of the Utah House of Representatives
Politicians from Provo, Utah
University of Utah alumni
21st-century American politicians
American Mormon missionaries in Paraguay